Darren Robinson may refer to:
 Darren Robinson (rapper) (1967–1995), founding member of The Fat Boys
 Darren Robinson (cricketer) (born 1973), English cricketer
 Darren Robinson (footballer) (born 2004), Northern Irish footballer